Dehart is an unincorporated community in Morgan County, Kentucky, United States.

History
Dehart is on Greasy Creek about a mile from its mouth on the Licking River. Settlement began circa 1836 and the Mussel Shoals School was established nearby in 1880.
The Dehart post office, named for Daniel Boone DeHart, the first postmaster, opened in 1909 and closed in 1963.

References

Unincorporated communities in Morgan County, Kentucky
Unincorporated communities in Kentucky